The Derby-Doerun Dolomite is a Cambrian geologic formation exposed in southeast Missouri. Originally the Derby and Doerun were originally considered separate formations, but now considered a single unit. The combined name is from the Derby Mine and the Doe Run Lead Company of the Old Lead Belt.

See also

 List of fossiliferous stratigraphic units in Missouri
 Paleontology in Missouri

References

 

Cambrian Missouri
Dolomite formations
Geography of St. Francois County, Missouri
Cambrian System of North America
Geologic formations of Missouri